USS Lynx may refer to:

, a schooner commissioned in 1815 that disappeared at sea in 1820
, a patrol boat in commission from 1917 to 1919
, a cargo ship in commission from 1943 to 1945

See also
, later renamed USS SP-730, a patrol boat in commission from 1917 to 1919

United States Navy ship names